Germán Martín Caffa (born 15 August 1982, in Concepción del Uruguay) is an Argentine footballer that currently plays as goalkeeper for Cortuluá.

Teams
 Club Gimnasia y Esgrima 1999–2000
 Club Ferro Carril Oeste 2000–2002
 Crucero del Norte 2003
 Atletico Candelaria 2004
 General Caballero 2005
 Olimpia 2005–2006
 Palestino 2006
 Tacuary FC 2007
 Newell's Old Boys 2008–2010
 Club Nacional (loan) 2010
 La Equidad 2010–2011
 Club Nacional 2012
 Banfield 2012–2013
 Crucero del Norte 2013–present

External links

1982 births
Living people
Argentine footballers
Argentine expatriate footballers
Argentina international footballers
Argentine Primera División players
Paraguayan Primera División players
Categoría Primera A players
Ferro Carril Oeste footballers
Crucero del Norte footballers
Newell's Old Boys footballers
General Caballero Sport Club footballers
Club Nacional footballers
Club Tacuary footballers
Club Olimpia footballers
La Equidad footballers
Club Deportivo Palestino footballers
Club Atlético Banfield footballers
Sportivo Luqueño players
Expatriate footballers in Chile
Expatriate footballers in Colombia
Expatriate footballers in Paraguay
Association football goalkeepers
Sportspeople from Entre Ríos Province